Mahatma Kabir may refer to:

 Mahatma Kabir (film), a 1947 Indian Kannada-language film
 Mahatma Kabir (1954 film), directed by Gajanan Jagirdar
 Mahathma Kabir, a 1962 Indian Kannada film